Loxilobus is a genus of ground-hoppers (Orthoptera: Caelifera) in the  tribe Thoradontini. Species have been recorded from West Africa, throughout Asia and Australia.

Species 
Loxilobus includes the species:
Loxilobus accola Rehn, 1952
Loxilobus acutus Hancock, 1904 - type species
Loxilobus angulatus Hancock, 1909
Loxilobus assamus Hancock, 1907
Loxilobus bantu Rehn, 1930
Loxilobus brunneri Günther, 1938
Loxilobus celebensis Günther, 1937
Loxilobus compactus Walker, 1871
Loxilobus desiderius Günther, 1938
Loxilobus dolichonotus Deng, 2018
Loxilobus formosanus Günther, 1941
Loxilobus insidiosus Bolívar, 1887
Loxilobus karnyi Günther, 1938
Loxilobus kraepelini Günther, 1938
Loxilobus leveri Günther, 1938
Loxilobus luzonicus Bruner, 1915
Loxilobus manillensis Bruner, 1915
Loxilobus novaebritanniae Günther, 1938
Loxilobus prominenoculus Zheng & Li, 2001
Loxilobus pulcher Bolívar, 1887
Loxilobus pullus Bolívar, 1887
Loxilobus rugosus Bolívar, 1887
Loxilobus saigonensis Günther, 1938
Loxilobus striatus Hancock, 1915
Loxilobus tongbiguanensis Zheng & Mao, 2010
Loxilobus truncatus Hancock, 1907
Loxilobus willemsei Günther, 1938
Loxilobus zhengi Deng, 2018

References

External links 
 

Tetrigidae
Caelifera genera
Orthoptera of Indo-China
Orthoptera of Africa
Orthoptera of Asia
Orthoptera of Australia